The Cité de la Musique ("City of Music"), also known as Philharmonie 2, is a group of institutions dedicated to music and situated in the Parc de la Villette, 19th arrondissement of Paris, France. It was designed with the nearby Conservatoire de Paris (CNSMDP) by the architect Christian de Portzamparc and opened in 1995. Part of François Mitterrand's Grands Projets, the Cité de la Musique reinvented La Villette – the former slaughterhouse district.

It consists of an amphitheater, a concert hall that can accommodate an audience of 800–1,000, a music museum containing an important collection of music instruments from different cultural traditions, dating mainly from the fifteenth- to twentieth-century, a music library, exhibition halls and workshops. In 2015 it was renamed Philharmonie 2 as part of the Philharmonie de Paris when a larger symphony hall was built by Jean Nouvel and named Philharmonie 1. Its official address is 221, Avenue Jean Jaurès, 75019 Paris.

Philharmonie 2

Musée de la Musique
The Musée de la Musique features a collection of about  items, comprising around  musical instruments,  instrument elements or  pieces of art (paintings, sculptures, etc.) collected by the Conservatoire de Paris since 1793 as well as some archives and a library of  written and audiovisual documents. The museum's collection, which opened to the public in 1864 and was relocated at the Cité de la musique in 1997, contains instruments used in Western classical, modern and non-European music from the sixteenth century to the present time. It includes lutes, archlutes, almost 200 classical guitars, violins by Italian luthiers Antonio Stradivari, the Guarneri family, Nicolò Amati; French and Flemish harpsichords; pianos by French piano-makers Sébastien Érard and Ignaz Pleyel; saxophones by Adolphe Sax, etc. and many are also presented online.

The instruments are exhibited in five departments by period and by type. Personal audio devices are provided to visitors at the entrance, allowing them to listen to commentary and musical excerpts played on the instruments, complemented by video screens and scale models along the way.

Gallery

See also
 List of music museums
 Cité des Sciences et de l'Industrie, in Parc de la Villette
 La Géode, an IMAX domed theatre in Parc de la Villette
 Le Zénith, a concert arena in Parc de la Villette

References

Further reading
Kim Eling, The Politics of Cultural Policy in France, Chapter 3: "La Cité de la Musique", Macmillan, 1999, pages 38–61. .

External links

 Cité de la Musique official website
 Médiathèque de la Cité de la musique   – Listen to excerpts of concerts
Online archive of musical instruments in the Musée de la Musique (in French)

1995 establishments in France
Museums in Paris
Buildings and structures in the 19th arrondissement of Paris
Music museums in France
Modernist architecture in France